Auchinleck railway station is a railway station in the village of Auchinleck, East Ayrshire, Scotland. The station is managed by ScotRail and is on the Glasgow South Western Line. It is also the nearest station to the larger town of Cumnock.

History 
The station was opened on 9 August 1848 by the Glasgow, Paisley, Kilmarnock and Ayr Railway, then joining the Glasgow and South Western Railway it became part of the London Midland and Scottish Railway during the Grouping of 1923. Passing on to the Scottish Region of British Railways during the nationalisation of 1948, it was then closed to passengers by the British Railways Board on 6 December 1965. It was reopened on 12 May 1984.

Facilities
There are now no permanent structures here apart from waiting shelters on each platform and the pedestrian footbridge.  Train running details are supplied via timetable posters, digital information screens, customer help points and automatic announcements.  Step-free access is available to both platforms via ramps.

2021 services 
As of 2021, there are 8 trains per day in each direction to Glasgow Central and 6 trains to per day to Carlisle on Monday to Saturdays, on a mostly 2 hourly frequency; however it is an uneven frequency meaning there is gaps of up to 3 hours at certain times of the day. One of the Carlisle trains extends through to Newcastle. 2 trains per day only go as far as Dumfries. On a Sunday a limited service of just 2 trains per day each way operate.

Views of the station

References

Notes

Sources

External links
Station on navigable O. S. map

Railway stations in East Ayrshire
Railway stations in Great Britain opened in 1848
Railway stations served by ScotRail
SPT railway stations
Railway stations in Great Britain closed in 1965
Railway stations in Great Britain opened in 1984
Beeching closures in Scotland
Former Glasgow and South Western Railway stations
Reopened railway stations in Great Britain
Auchinleck